Brereton Social Football Club is a football club based in Brereton in Rugeley, Staffordshire, England.

History
Brereton Social F.C. was formed in 1899.  The team have spent three separate spells as members of the West Midlands (Regional) League. The first began in 1968–69 and lasted for twenty years. During that time they won promotion form Division One in 1971–72 but they never finished higher than fourth until they left the league during the 1987–88 season to join the Staffordshire County League (South).

They rejoined the West Midlands (Regional) League in 1995–96 and stayed in Division One North until the club folded in 1999. A year later the club was reformed and rejoined the league, finishing in second place in 2005–06 before being transferred sideways to the Midland Combination Premier Division. In 2008 the club was relegated to Division One. For the 2010–11 season, the team were initially members of the Midland Combination Division One, which sits at level 11 of the English football league system, but resigned on 28 August 2010.

Ground
The Red Lion Ground has a club house with cover in front, a small stand and floodlighting.

Supporters
The club normally averages around 50 spectators at a home match, although the visit of Heath Hayes in the 2007–08 season saw a crowd of 212, the highest of the season in the Premier Division.

Honours
West Midlands (Regional) League Division One
Champions 1970–71
Runners-up 1968–69, 1971–72, 2005–06

Club records
Best league position: 4th in West Midlands (Regional) League Premier Division, 1973–74, 1974–75, 1976–77, 1980–81
Best FA Cup performance: 3rd qualifying round, 1978–79
Best FA Trophy performance: 1st round proper, 1974–75
Best FA Vase performance: 2nd round proper, 1985–86

Honours
Staffordshire FA Challenge Cup	Runners Up 1949–50
Staffordshire FA Challenge Cup	Winners	1955–56
Staffordshire FA Challenge Cup	Winners	1961–62
Staffordshire FA Challenge Cup	Winners	1966–67
Staffordshire FA Challenge Cup	Winners	1967–68
West Midlands (Regional) League League Cup	- Winners 1969–70
West Midlands (Regional) League Division One – Winners 1970–71
West Midlands (Regional) League League Cup	- Winners 1972–73
West Midlands (Regional) League League Cup	- Winners 1997–98
Staffordshire FA Challenge Cup	Winners	1997–98
Staffordshire FA Challenge Cup	Winners	2001–02
Staffordshire Senior League Division 2 Runners up 	2016–17
Staffordshire Senior League, League Cup Winners 	 2016–17
Staffordshire Senior League Division 1 Runners up 	 2017–18

References

External links
Official club website

Midland Football Combination
Football clubs in Staffordshire
Association football clubs established in 1899
1899 establishments in England
Rugeley
Football clubs in England
Staffordshire County League (South)
Staffordshire County Senior League